This is a list of airports in Cambodia, sorted by location. Cambodia has only 3 major operating airports with commercial flights. The State Secretariat of Civil Aviation oversees the operations of all airports in Cambodia.

Cambodia, officially the Kingdom of Cambodia, is a country in Southeast Asia that borders Thailand to the west and northwest, Laos to the north and Vietnam to the east and southeast. In the south it faces the Gulf of Thailand. Phnom Penh is the capital and largest city. Siem Reap, a city located near the famed ruins of Angkor Wat is the gateway to the Angkor region, and is Cambodia's main destination for tourism. Battambang, the largest city in western Cambodia, is known for its rice production and Sihanoukville, a coastal city, is the primary sea port.

A fourth international airport in Koh Kong Province was announced in September 2016.



Airports

Airport names shown in bold indicate the airport has scheduled service on commercial airlines.

See also 

 List of airlines of Cambodia
 Transport in Cambodia
 List of airports by ICAO code: V#VD - Cambodia
 Wikipedia:WikiProject Aviation/Airline destination lists: Asia#Cambodia

References 

 Cambodian airports and airfields
 
  - includes IATA codes
 World Aero Data: Airports in Cambodia
 Great Circle Mapper: Airports in Cambodia

 
Cambodia
Airports
Airports
Cambodia